Gratiola neglecta is a species of flowering plant known by the common name clammy hedgehyssop. It is native to much of North America, including most all of the United States and the southern half of Canada. It is generally found in moist to wet habitat. This is an unobtrusive annual herb producing a glandular stem up to about 30 centimeters tall. The lance-shaped to oval leaves are arranged oppositely about the stem. They are up to 5 centimeters long and sometimes toothed along the edges. The inflorescence is a raceme of nearly cylindrical tubular whitish flowers each about a centimeter long. At the base of each flower is a fringe of five pointed sepals. The fruit is a spherical capsule about half a centimeter wide.

References

External links
Jepson Manual Treatment
MissouriPlants Photo Profile 
Illinois Wildflowers Profile

neglecta
Flora of North America